Eucalyptus apiculata, commonly known as the narrow-leaved mallee ash and is a mallee that is endemic to New South Wales. It has smooth white or greyish bark, narrow lance-shaped adult leaves, flower buds in groups of three to seven, white flowers and urn-shaped or barrel-shaped fruit.

Description
Eucalyptus apiculata is a mallee with smooth white or greyish bark. They are the same glossy green colour on both sides. There is a small point or hook on the end of the leaves. Flowering occurs between October and March and the flowers are white.

Taxonomy and naming
Eucalyptus apiculata was first formally described in 1902 by Richard Thomas Baker and Henry George Smith who published the description in a paper entitled A research on the eucalypts : especially in regard to their essential oils. The specific epithet (apiculata) is a Latin word meaning "apiculate", referring to the leaves.

Distribution and habitat
The narrow-leaved mallee ash is a rare species with a restricted distribution between Linden and Berrima where it grows in mallee shrubland.

References

apiculata
Flora of New South Wales
Myrtales of Australia
Plants described in 1902
Taxa named by Richard Thomas Baker